Mimic 3: Sentinel is a 2003 science fiction horror film written and directed by J. T. Petty, with a script inspired by a short story of the same name by Donald A. Wollheim. The movie was a direct-to-DVD sequel to Mimic (1997) and Mimic 2 (2001).

Mimic 3: Sentinel stars horror film veteran Lance Henriksen and takes a departure from the tone of the first two films, as it has a feel similar to Alfred Hitchcock's Rear Window rather than the action/horror tone of its predecessors.

Plot
Unable to leave the germ-free confines of his sterilized bedroom for any real stretch of time, environmentally hypersensitive Marvin (Karl Geary) spends his days taking pictures of his neighbors from his window. Occasionally catching glimpses of his young sister Rosy (Alexis Dziena) hanging out with the neighborhood drug dealer, Marvin's lens remains mostly fixed on a mysterious neighbor known as the Garbageman (Lance Henriksen) and pretty neighbor Carmen (Rebecca Mader), while his slightly overbearing mother (Amanda Plummer) rests on the couch. As neighbors begin disappearing and mysterious figures move in and out of Marvin's viewfinder, the secluded voyeur begins to suspect that a sinister force is at work in his neighborhood. Though Rosy and Carmen are anxious to assist in a little detective work, the situation soon begins to spiral out of control upon the discovery that the Judas breed is far from extinct.

Cast

 Lance Henriksen as Garbageman
 Karl Geary as Marvin Montrose
 Alexis Dziena as Rosy Montrose
 Keith Robinson as Desmond
 Tudorel Filimon as Birdman (credited as Filimon Tudorel)
 Rebecca Mader as Carmen
 Maria Oprescu as Ma Bell
 Mircea Constantinescu as Mr. Pasture
 Mircea Anca Jr. as Noah Pasture
 Amanda Plummer as Simone Montrose
 John Kapelos as Detective Gary Dumars
 Ion Haiduc as Moustache
 Nicolae Constantin Tanase as Thug #1 (credited as Nicolae Constantin)
 Luana Stoica as Female Victim #1
 Marius Silviu Florentin as Thug #2
 Nick Phillips as CDC Worker
 Alex Cioalca as Adam Pasture
 Mike J. Regan as Mimic Bug #1 (uncredited)
 Alex Revan as Mutant Elite (uncredited)
 Gary J. Tunnicliffe as Mimic Bug #2 (uncredited)

References

External links
 
 
 

2003 films
2003 direct-to-video films
2003 horror films
2000s monster movies
2000s science fiction horror films
American monster movies
American natural horror films
American science fiction horror films
Direct-to-video horror films
Direct-to-video sequel films
Films directed by J. T. Petty
Dimension Films films
2000s English-language films
2000s American films